20th Century Masters – The Millennium Collection: The Best of Boyz II Men is a 2003 mid-price greatest hits LP for R&B group Boyz II Men, released by Motown Records.

Track listing 
 "End of the Road"
 "It's So Hard to Say Goodbye to Yesterday"
 "Motownphilly"
 "In the Still of the Night (I'll Remember)"
 "Uhh Ahh"
 "I'll Make Love to You"
 "Thank You"
 "Water Runs Dry"
 "4 Seasons of Loneliness"
 "A Song for Mama"

Charts

References

Boyz II Men compilation albums
Boyz II Men
Albums produced by Dallas Austin
2003 greatest hits albums
Motown compilation albums
Albums produced by Babyface (musician)
Albums produced by Jimmy Jam and Terry Lewis